The Lexington Avenue/51st Street station is a New York City Subway station complex on the IRT Lexington Avenue Line and IND Queens Boulevard Line. The station is located on Lexington Avenue and stretches from 51st Street to 53rd Street in Midtown Manhattan. It is served by the 6 and E trains at all times, and by M trains during weekdays. In addition, <6> trains stop here during weekdays in the peak direction, and 4 trains stop here during late nights.

The complex comprises two stations: 51st Street on the Lexington Avenue Line and Lexington Avenue–53rd Street station (originally Lexington—Third Avenues) on the Queens Boulevard Line. Originally two separate stations, these were connected in 1988 via a transfer passage, which was opened with the construction of 599 Lexington Avenue. Approximately 50,000 riders transfer between the Lexington Avenue and Queens Boulevard Lines each weekday.

In 2019, the station complex had an annual ridership of 18,957,465, making it the tenth-busiest in the system.



History

Planning and construction

IRT Lexington Avenue Line
Following the completion of the original subway, there were plans to construct a line along Manhattan's east side north of 42nd Street. The original plan for what became the extension north of 42nd Street was to continue it south through Irving Place and into what is now the BMT Broadway Line at Ninth Street and Broadway. In July 1911, the IRT had withdrawn from the talks, and the Brooklyn Rapid Transit Company (BRT) was to operate on Lexington Avenue. The IRT submitted an offer for what became its portion of the Dual Contracts on February 27, 1912.

In 1913, as part of the Dual Contracts, which were signed on March 19, 1913, the Public Service Commission planned to split the original Interborough Rapid Transit Company (IRT) system from looking like a "Z" system (as seen on a map) to an "H"-shaped system. The original system would be split into three segments: two north–south lines, carrying through trains over the Lexington Avenue and Broadway–Seventh Avenue Lines, and a west–east shuttle under 42nd Street. This would form a roughly "H"-shaped system. It was predicted that the subway extension would lead to the growth of the Upper East Side and the Bronx.

51st Street station opened on July 17, 1918, with service initially running between Grand Central–42nd Street station and 167th Street via the line's local tracks. On August 1, the "H system" was put into place, with through service beginning on the new east and west side trunk lines, and the institution of the 42nd Street Shuttle along the old connection between the sides. The cost of the extension from Grand Central was $58 million.

IND Queens Boulevard Line
The Queens Boulevard Line was one of the first built by the city-owned Independent Subway System (IND), and was planned to stretch between the IND Eighth Avenue Line in Manhattan and 178th Street and Hillside Avenue in Jamaica, Queens, with a stop at Lexington Avenue. The line was first proposed in 1925. Bids for the 53rd Street subway tunnel were received in October 1926, and work started in April 1927. The 53rd Street Tunnel was fully excavated between Queens and Manhattan in January 1929. The First Avenue Association suggested that an entrance to the Lexington Avenue/53rd Street station on the Queens Boulevard Line be built on Second Avenue, but the New York City Board of Transportation declined to do so, citing high costs and underground obstructions.

The Lexington Avenue/53rd Street station opened on August 19, 1933 with the opening of the IND Queens Boulevard Line to Roosevelt Avenue in Queens. Service was initially provided by E trains running via the IND Eighth Avenue Line. On December 15, 1940, the IND Sixth Avenue Line opened between West Fourth Street–Washington Square and 59th Street–Columbus Circle. On this date,  trains began using this station, diverging west of the station onto the Sixth Avenue Line.

Modifications and station renovations
The city government took over the IRT's operations on June 12, 1940. In 1966, an agreement was reached with the developers of 345 Park Avenue to remove the entrance at the corner of 51st Street and Lexington Avenue and replace it with a new entrance at the same corner adjacent to the building.

In July 1968, the New York City Transit Authority (NYCTA) completed plans to construct a -long free transfer passageway between the north end of the 51st Street station and the Lexington Avenue mezzanine of the Lexington Avenue station. Construction on the project was supposed to start in early 1969. On December 12, 1969, the NYCTA put the estimated $2.5 million contract up for bid.

The IRT platforms' elevators were installed in June 1989, making the station one of the earliest to comply with the Americans with Disabilities Act of 1990. The elevator to the IND platform was installed later.

The transfer between the IRT and IND platforms was temporarily closed between May and September 1996 due to renovations. During that time, the Gottlieb Group replaced four escalators in the complex for $10.5 million. In 2003, as part of efforts to ease crowding in the station, a mezzanine was added to connect the passageway to the Third Avenue end of the IND station.

Station layout 

The IRT Lexington Avenue Line station is a local stop with two tracks and two side platforms. It runs north–south under Lexington Avenue from 50th to 52nd Street. The IND Queens Boulevard Line station is an express stop with two tracks and one island platform. It runs west–east under 53rd Street with a mezzanine from Lexington Avenue to Third Avenue. The mezzanine is divided into two sections by three separate fare control areas. 

A passageway links the northbound IRT platform and the mezzanine of the IND platform. From the extreme north end of both IRT platforms, a staircase, an elevator, and an escalator lead to an underpass connecting the southbound and northbound IRT platforms, linking to a corridor extending north from the northbound platform. The corridor extends north to the staircases and escalators going down to the IND platform, with a turnstile bank in the center. The corridor is divided into two sections: a shopping arcade outside fare control and a transfer hallway inside fare control. At the north end of the corridor are two escalators (one up-only, the other reversible-direction) and a staircase down to the west end of the IND platform. A down-only escalator, a reversible-direction escalator, and an elevator are located to the east, leading to the center of the IND platform.

Exits 
The section of the transfer corridor outside fare control leads to a staircase and elevator inside the south side of 132 East 53rd Street, which go up to the northeast corner of East 52nd Street and Lexington Avenue. A glass-enclosed staircase outside the same building leads to the southeast corner of 53rd Street and Lexington Avenue. Outside fare control under the Citigroup Center, at the northeast corner of the same intersection, there are two stairs and an elevator.

The southbound Lexington Avenue Line platform has a part-time fare control area near the south end. A seven-step staircase goes up to a turnstile bank. Outside fare control, there is a customer assistance booth and one staircase going up to a plaza at 560 Lexington Avenue on the northwest corner of Lexington Avenue and East 50th Street. The entrance's current design was part of a renovation of the plaza designed by Skidmore, Owings & Merrill and completed in 2015. The New York Public Library's Terence Cardinal Cooke-Cathedral Branch is within this exit, just outside of fare control. The  branch, the second smallest in the NYPL system, became part of the New York Public Library in 1992. Before that, it was a library for the Roman Catholic Archdiocese of New York.

At Lexington Avenue and 51st Street, eight stairs go up to all four corners of that intersection (two to each corner). The eastern stairs serve the northbound platform, and the western stairs serve the southbound platform. At one point, there was also an entrance from the southbound platform to the basement of the General Electric Building at 51st Street, which opened in 1931 and was sealed, being replaced by a new street entrance in 1965. The connecting passageway was made of marble with aluminum storefronts. The entrance in the General Electric Building's basement replaced the original sidewalk staircases at the southwestern corner of Lexington Avenue and 51st Street.

The Queens Boulevard Line platform has an unstaffed entrance/exit at the east (railroad north) end. Two staircases go up to either western corner of Third Avenue and 53rd Street. A larger staircase goes up to the entrance plaza of 205 East 53rd Street at the northeast corner, and there is also an entrance/exit from under the southeast-corner building. The original name, Lexington–3rd Avenues, came from this exit. The fare control area contains access to both the primary mezzanine, which contains the IRT transfer, as well as a set of staircases and escalators leading directly to the east end of the IND platform.

IRT Lexington Avenue Line platforms

The 51st Street station on the IRT Lexington Avenue Line is a local station with two local tracks and two side platforms. Both platforms have emergency exits from the lower level express tracks.

The station features modern beige bricks over the original tiles, but the standard IRT-style mosaics remain intact. There is a crossunder at the extreme north end of the platforms with an elevator, a staircase, and an up-only escalator on each side. A ceramic artwork called Tunnel Vision by Nina Yankowitz was installed here in 1989, but was removed after a 2016 retiling.

A staircase of seven steps goes up to a turnstile bank, with a token booth and two exits to each corner on each side outside fare control.

This station is the southernmost station on the Lexington Avenue Line to be directly under Lexington Avenue itself. South of here, the line shifts slightly westward to Park Avenue.

Image gallery

IND Queens Boulevard Line platform

The Lexington Avenue–53rd Street station on the IND Queens Boulevard Line opened on August 19, 1933 and has two tracks and one island platform. As a result, long escalators and staircases are required to reach the mezzanine from the platform. At the extreme west end of the Queens Boulevard Line platform, a single staircase and a bank of two escalators (which were once the longest in the world), a single escalator, and one ADA-accessible elevator go up to the full-time mezzanine.

There are no tiles, trim line, or mosaics on the track walls. East of this station (railroad north), the line goes under the East River to Long Island City, Queens.

Artwork 
In 1976, with funding from the Exxon Corporation, this station, as well as three others citywide, received new "artfully humorous graffiti" murals and artwork. Local designer Sperling Elman Inc. received $5,000 to place a new coat of paint on the entrances. The paint was placed "in a variety of colors and in broad stripes."

The 2004 artwork here is called Passing Through by Al Held. It features glass mosaic on the mezzanine walls.

Image gallery

Proposed Second Avenue Subway station 
As part of the construction of the Second Avenue Subway, the Metropolitan Transportation Authority has considered including a transfer between this station complex and the proposed 55th Street station on the Second Avenue Line, which would be located under Second Avenue between 52nd Street and 56th Street. This would provide a transfer to the proposed T train, which would serve the Second Avenue Line upon completion of Phase 3, although that phase is currently not funded or scheduled. Currently, the transfer is under evaluation. The proposed transfer passage would run under 53rd Street between the eastern end of the Queens Boulevard Line platform and Second Avenue, connecting to the southern end of 55th Street station. The MTA projects that providing a transfer between the Queens Boulevard and Second Avenue lines would reduce crowding in the existing transfer passage between the Queens Boulevard and Lexington Avenue lines at the western end of the Queens Boulevard Line platform.

References

External links 

 
 nycsubway.org — Tunnel Vision Artwork by Nina Yankowitz (1989)
 nycsubway.org — Passing Through Artwork by Al Held (2004)
 
 Station Reporter — 51st Street/Lexington Avenue Complex

MTA: Arts for Transit:

 51st Street/Lexington Avenue-53rd Street Page 1
 Lexington Avenue-53rd Street Page 2
 Lexington Avenue–53rd Street
 51st Street/Lexington Avenue - 53rd Street

Google Maps Street View:

 Lexington Avenue and 53rd Street entrance 
 Lexington Avenue and 52nd Street entrance 
 Lexington Avenue and 51st Street entrance 
 Lexington Avenue and 50th Street entrance 
 Third Avenue and 53rd Street entrance 
 IND platform 
 IRT platforms 
 Lobby at Turnsitles 

IRT Lexington Avenue Line stations
IND Queens Boulevard Line stations
New York City Subway transfer stations
New York City Subway stations in Manhattan
Railway stations in the United States opened in 1918
1918 establishments in New York City
Midtown Manhattan
Proposed IND Second Avenue Line stations
Turtle Bay, Manhattan